is a mausoleum complex of the Japanese Emperors in Nagabusa-machi, Hachiōji, Tokyo, Japan. Located within a forest in the western suburbs of Tokyo and named for the ancient Musashi Province, the site contains the mausolea of Emperor Taishō and Emperor Shōwa, as well as those of their wives, Empress Teimei and Empress Kōjun.

History
Emperor Taishō was the first Emperor of Japan to be buried in Tokyo. He has been called the first "Tokyo Emperor" because he was the first to live his entire life in or near Tokyo. His father, Emperor Meiji, was born and reared in Kyoto; and although he later lived and died in Tokyo, his mausoleum is located on the outskirts of Kyoto, near the tombs of his Imperial forebears.

It is under the administration of the Archives and Mausolea Department.

Design
The imperial graveyard in Hachiōji is designed as a semi-natural planted space which mainly consists of woodland, rocks and trees. In addition to the stone-topped Imperial mausolea, it also contains smaller monuments and religious structures, like Torii.

The approach to the Musashi Imperial Graveyard from the Kōshū Kaidō is lined with zelkova and the mausolea planted with cryptomeria.

Tombs

Future
In 2012 and 2013, the Imperial Household Agency confirmed press reports that Emperor Akihito and Empress Michiko do not plan to be buried like their immediate predecessors, but to be cremated, for which cremation facilities will be added to the Musashi Imperial Graveyard. Their ashes will then be interred in individual mausoleums, to be built side by side in an integrated fashion, on the west side of the tomb of Emperor Taishō. This adaptation of the imperial funeral rites will mark a historic change from some 350 years in which in-ground burials were the norm for monarchs and their spouses. The Imperial Household Agency plans that the two new mausoleums will have an area of some 3,500 square metres, about 80 percent of the 4,300 square metres of the tomb of the Emperor's parents, Emperor Shōwa and Empress Kōjun.

See also
 Death and funeral of Emperor Shōwa
 Musashi Province
 Meiji no Mori Takao Quasi-National Park
 Takao Station (Tokyo)
 Mausoleums of Emperors of Japan
 Fushimi Momoyama no Misasagi in Kyoto, Kyoto Prefecture, Japan.

References

External links 

Mausoleums in Japan
Western Tokyo
Taishō period
Shōwa period
Emperor Taishō
Hachiōji, Tokyo
Imperial Household Agency